Hermanville War Cemetery is a Second World War cemetery of Commonwealth soldiers in France, located 13 km north of Caen, Normandy. The cemetery contains 1,003 commonwealth war graves.

History
Originally called Sword Beach Cemetery due to its close proximity to Sword Beach, Hermanville British war cemetery was set up shortly after the landings. It contains many soldiers of the 3rd Division who stormed the beach on D-Day, 6 June 1944, and then pushed on towards Caen.

The cemetery also contains a large number of naval and marine commando casualties, as well as graves moved to the cemetery from Operation Goodwood in July and from the fighting to close the Falaise Gap in August 1944.

Location
The cemetery is in the commune of Hermanville-sur-Mer on Rue du Cimetière Anglais (off the D.60).

See also
 American Battle Monuments Commission
 UK National Inventory of War Memorials
 German War Graves Commission
 List of military cemeteries in Normandy

References

Further reading
 Shilleto, Carl, and Tolhurst, Mike (2008). "A Traveler’s Guide to D-Day and the Battle of Normandy". Northampton, Mass.: Interlink.

External links
 

British military memorials and cemeteries
Canadian military memorials and cemeteries
Commonwealth War Graves Commission cemeteries in France
Operation Overlord cemeteries
World War II memorials in France
1944 establishments in France